In mathematics, the Riesz potential is a potential named after its discoverer, the Hungarian mathematician Marcel Riesz.  In a sense, the Riesz potential defines an inverse for a power of the Laplace operator on Euclidean space.  They generalize to several variables the Riemann–Liouville integrals of one variable.

Definition 
If 0 < α < n, then the Riesz potential Iαf of a locally integrable function f on Rn is the function defined by

where the constant is given by

This singular integral is well-defined provided f decays sufficiently rapidly at infinity, specifically if f ∈ Lp(Rn) with 1 ≤ p < n/α. In fact, for any 1 ≤ p (p>1 is classical, due to Sobolev, while for p=1 see  ), the rate of decay of f and that of Iαf are related in the form of an inequality (the Hardy–Littlewood–Sobolev inequality)

where  is the vector-valued Riesz transform.  More generally, the operators Iα are well-defined for complex α such that .

The Riesz potential can be defined more generally in a weak sense as the convolution

where Kα is the locally integrable function:

The Riesz potential can therefore be defined whenever f is a compactly supported distribution.  In this connection, the Riesz potential of a positive Borel measure μ with compact support is chiefly of interest in potential theory because Iαμ is then a (continuous) subharmonic function off the support of μ, and is lower semicontinuous on all of Rn.

Consideration of the Fourier transform reveals that the Riesz potential is a Fourier multiplier.
In fact, one has

and so, by the convolution theorem,

The Riesz potentials satisfy the following semigroup property on, for instance, rapidly decreasing continuous functions

provided

Furthermore, if , then

One also has, for this class of functions,

See also
 Bessel potential
 Fractional integration
 Sobolev space

Notes

References

.
 

 
 

Fractional calculus
Partial differential equations
Potential theory
Singular integrals